German proverbs
Proverbs